The 1989 British motorcycle Grand Prix was the twelfth round of the 1989 Grand Prix motorcycle racing season. It took place on the weekend of 4–6 August 1989 at Donington Park.

500 cc race report
Luca Cadalora is brought in to replace Freddie Spencer, who’s been released by team manager Giacomo Agostini.

In the first lap Wayne Rainey’s in front of a group of 4 riders, with Kevin Schwantz, Christian Sarron and Eddie Lawson. Rainey and Schwantz trade the lead, while Niall Mackenzie comes up from behind. Mackenzie is having a good day, as he passes Lawson and Rainey to move into second behind Schwantz. Mackenzie takes the lead for half a lap, but Schwantz gets it back at the chicane, and soon Lawson passes him as well. Wayne Gardner retires with a mechanical.

Rainey passes Mackenzie, but Schwantz and Lawson have gotten far ahead. Schwantz takes the win from Lawson by a few bike lengths, and Rainey comes in third. With 3 rounds to go, Lawson is less than 7 points away from Rainey with 60 points still to be decided.

500 cc classification

References

British motorcycle Grand Prix
British
Motorcycle Grand Prix